Socorro Bonilla (born María del Socorro Martínez Ortega on August 20, 1947) is a Mexican actress.

Filmography

Awards and nominations

References

External links

1947 births
Living people
Mexican child actresses
Mexican telenovela actresses
Mexican television actresses
Mexican film actresses
Actresses from Chihuahua (state)
20th-century Mexican actresses
21st-century Mexican actresses
People from Camargo, Chihuahua